The 51st International Film Festival of India was held from 16 to 24 January 2021 in Goa. Due to the COVID-19 pandemic the festival went  hybrid, there was physical and virtual screening of 50 films out of 224 films across various categories. Bangladesh was country of focus in the festival with four films of the country included in 'country of focus' section.

The festival highlighted autism spectrum disorder (ASD) by premiering a film by Shreedhar, In Our World in non-feature film, Indian Panorama section on 18 January 2021.

The opening and closing ceremonies of the festival were aired live on DD India and DD National channels on 16 January and 24 January 2021, respectively.

Events
Being a ‘hybrid’ film festival, a few events are organised online also.

Retrospective films
 Live Flesh, Bad Education and Volver by Pedro Almodóvar (Spain)
 The Square and Force Majeure by Ruben Östlund (Sweden)
 One on One by Kim Ki-duk (South Korea)

Master classes
Shekhar Kapur, Priyadarshan, Perry Lang, Subhash Ghai and Tanvir Mokammel are scheduled to hold master classes.

In-conversation sessions
Ricky Kej 
Madhur Bhandarkar
Anjali Menon 
Prasoon Joshi
Rahul Rawail
Aditya Dhar
John Matthew Matthan 
Prasanna Vithanage 
Bickram Ghosh
Abu Bakr Shawky 
Anupama Chopra
Sunil Doshi 
Dominic Sangma
Sunit Tandon 
Hariharan 
Pablo Cesar

Tribute
Tribute to the celebrated filmmaker Satyajit Ray marking his birth centenary by screening his classic works:

Charulata (1964)
Ghare Baire (1984)
Pather Panchali (1955)
Shatranj Ke Khilari (1977)
Sonar Kella (1974)

Tribute to Netaji Subhas Chandra Bose on the occasion of his 125th birth anniversary by screening film:
 
Netaji Subhas Chandra Bose: The Forgotten Hero by Shyam Benegal

Online events
 50 films out of 224 films across various categories are scheduled to be screened online.
 Opening and closing ceremony live telecast
 Q&A sessions 
 Film appreciation sessions by Film and Television Institute of India professors: Mazhar Kamran, Madhu Apsara and Pankaj Saxena
 Mid fest world premiere of Mehrunisa

Jury
Sources:

International jury
 Pablo César (Argentina), director, producer, writer, actor and editor, Chairman
 Prasanna Vithanage (Sri Lanka), filmmaker
 Abu Bakr Shawky (Austria), writer and director
 Priyadarshan (India), director, screenwriter and producer
 Rubaiyat Hossain (Bangladesh), director, writer and producer

Feature film jury
John Matthew Matthan, filmmaker, screenwriter and producer, Chairperson
Dominic Sangma, filmmaker and screenwriter
Jadumoni Dutta, filmmaker, screenwriter and producer
Kala Master, choreographer
Kumar Sohoni, filmmaker and writer
Rama Vij,  actor and producer
B. Ramamurthy, filmmaker
Sanghamitra Chaudhuri, filmmaker and journalist
Sanjay Puran Singh Chauhan, filmmaker
Satinder Mohan, film critic and journalist
Sudhakar Vasantha, filmmaker and producer
T Prasanna Kumar, film producer
U Radhakrishnan, ex-secretary, Federation of Film Societies of India

Non-feature film jury
 Haobam Paban Kumar, feature and documentary filmmaker, Chairperson
Atul Gangwar, director, screenwriter, and producer
Jwngdao Bodosa, filmmaker
Mandar Talauliker, filmmaker
Sajin Babu, filmmaker
Satish Pande, producer and director
Vaijayanti Apte, script writer and producer

Winners
Sources:

 Golden Peacock (Best Film): Into the Darkness
 Silver Peacock: 
IFFI Best Director Award: Chen-Nien Ko for Taiwanese film The Silent Forest
IFFI Best Actor Award (Male): Tzu-Chuan Liu, film The Silent Forest
IFFI Best Actor Award (Female): Zofia Stafiej for Polish film I Never Cry
IFFI Best Debut Director Award: Valentina by Cassio Pereira dos Santos
Silver Peacock Special Jury Award: February by Kamen Kalev
Special Mention:   Kripal Kalita for the film Bridge

Special awards
Life Time Achievement Award - Vittorio Storaro
IFFI ICFT UNESCO Gandhi Medal: 200 Meters by Ameen Nayfeh
Indian Film Personality of the Year - Biswajit Chatterjee

Official selections
Source:

Opening film
 Another Round (Denmark), by Thomas Vinterberg, it was Denmark's official entry to the Oscars, in 2020.

Mid fest film
Mehrunisa (Austria), directed by Sandeep Kumar, stars formidable actor Farrukh Jaffar (88). The film revolves around the story that lends wings to a woman's lifelong dream.

Closing film
Wife of a Spy (Japan), theatrical version of television film directed by Kiyoshi Kurosawa, a historical drama won the Silver Lion for Best Director at 77th Venice International Film Festival.

Kaleidoscope section
Twelve foreign films were screened in this section.

These include:

 Night of the Kings by Philippe Lacôte (France)
 Love Affair(s) by Emmanuel Mouret (France)
 The Big Hit (Un triomphe) by Emmanuel Courcol (France)
 Window Boy Would also Like to Have a Submarine by Alex Piperno (Uruguay)
 Forgotten We’ll Be by Fernando Trueba (Columbia)
 Haifa Street by Mohanad Hayal (Iraq)
 We Still Have the Deep Black Night by Gustavo Galvao (Brazil, Germany)
 Parthenon by Mantas Kvedaravicius (Lithuania)
 Apples by Christos Nikou (Greece)
 My Little Sister by Stephanie Chuat and Veronique Reymond (Switzerland)
 The Death of Cinema and My Father Too by Dani Rosenberg (Israel)
 Valley of the Gods by Lech Majewski (Poland)

Golden peacock award
In international section, 15 films are competing for the Golden Peacock Award. Argentine filmmaker Pablo Cesar is head of its international jury panel.

The films competing for the Golden Peacock Award are:

 The Domain by Tiago Guedes (Portugal)
 Into The Darkness by Anders Refn (Denmark)
 February by Kamen Kalev (Bulgaria, France)
 My Best Part by Nicolas Maury (France)
 I Never Cry by Piotr Domalewski (Poland, Ireland)
 La Veronica by Leonardo Medel (Chile)
 Light For The Youth by Shin Su-won (South Korea)
 Red Moon Tide by Lois Patiño (Spain)
 Dream About Sohrab by Ali Ghavitan (Iran)
 The Dogs Didn’t Sleep Last Night by Ramin Rasouli (Afghanistan, Iran)
 The Silent Forest by KO Chen-Nien (Taiwan)
 Bridge by Kripal Kalita (India)
 A Dog and His Man by Siddharth Tripathy (India)
 Thaen by Ganesh Vinayakan (India)
 Award winning film

Indian panorama award
Feature films
Saand Ki Aankh (Hindi), opening film
Bridge (Assamese)
Avijatrik (Bengali) 
 Aavartan (Hindi)
A Dog And His Man (Chhattisgarhi) 
Brahma Janen Gopon Kommoti (Bengali)
Pinki Elli? (Kannada) 
Safe (Malayalam) 
Eigi Kona (Manipuri) 
Prawaas (Marathi)
Kalira Atita (Oriya) 
Thaen (Tamil) 
Gatham (Telugu)
Asuran (Tamil) 
Chhichhore (Hindi) 
Kappela (Malayalam) 
Up, Up & Up (animation)
Namo (Sanskrit)
June (Marathi)
Karkhanisanchi Waari (Marathi)
Kettyolaanu Ente Malakha (Malayalam)
Thahira (Malayalam)
Trance (Malayalam)

Non feature films

 100 Years Of Chrysotom - A Biographical Film (English)
 Ahimsa- Gandhi: The Power Of The Powerless (English)
 Catdog (Hindi)
Drama Queens (English)
Green Blackberries (Nepali)
Highways Of Life (Manipuri)
Holy Rights (Hindi)
In Our World (English)
Investing Life (English)
Jaadoo (Hindi)
Jhat Aayi Basant (Pahari/Hindi)
Justice Delayed But Delivered (Hindi)
Khisa (Marathi)
Oru Paathiraa Swapnam Pole (Malayalam)
Paanchika (Gujarati)
Pandhara Chivda (Marathi)
Radha (Bengali)
Shantabai (Hindi)
Still Alive (Marathi)
The 14th February & Beyond, by Utpal Kalal (English), It's an investigative film on Valentine's Day

In memoriam
A special section in this festival will be organized in honour of the artists who died in the year 2020 to pay homage to them.
 42 starring Chadwick Boseman
 Basant Bahar starring Nimmi
 Bobby starring Rishi Kapoor
 Brahmachari
 Chilika Teerey starring Bijay Mohanty
 Charulata, by Satyajit Ray, starring Soumitra Chatterjee
 Chhoti Si Baat by Basu Chatterjee
 Cutter's Way by Ivan Passer
 Dabangg, music directed by Wajid Khan
 Devdas, dance choreographed by Saroj Khan
 Dombivali Fast by Nishikant Kamat
 Ek Din Achanak
 E.T. the Extra-Terrestrial
 Extremely Loud & Incredibly Close starring Max von Sydow
 Gandhi costume designer Bhanu Athaiya
 Ghare Baire, Satyajit Ray
 Kedarnath starring Sushant Singh Rajput
 Land of the Gods
 Midnight Express by Alan Parker
 Mission Kashmir
 Paan Singh Tomar starring Irrfan Khan
 Paths of Glory
 Sigaram starring S. P. Balasubrahmanyam
 Sonar Kella starring Soumitra Chatterjee
 Soorma Bhopali by Jagdeep
 Tara
 The Hateful Eight music composed by Ennio Morricone
 The Heiress starring Olivia de Havilland

World panorama
Source
Only Human by Igor Ivanov (Macedonia)
The Lawyer by Romas Zabarauskar (Lithuania) 
Rupsa Nodir Banke by Tanvir Mokammel (Bangladesh)
Buiten Is Het Feest by Jelle Nesna (Netherlands) 
3 PUFF by Saman Salour (Andorra)
The Atlantic City Story by Henry Butash (USA)
Gesture by Pouya Parsamagham (Iran)
Zhanym, Ty Ne Poverish by Ernar Nurgaliev (Kazakhstan)
Running Against The Wind by Jan Philipp Weyl (Germany, Ethiopia)
Spring Blossom by Suzanne Lindon (France)
The Audition by Ina Weisse (Germany)
Moral Order by Mario Barroso (Portugal)
Unidentified by Bogdan George Apetri (Romania)
The First Death of Joana by Cristiane Oliveira (Brazil)
The trouble with Nature by Illum Jacobi (Denmark, France)
The Castle by Lina LužYtė (Lithuania, Ireland)
Maternal by Maura Delpero (Italy)
A Fish Swimming Upside Down by Erliza Pëtkova (Germany)
Fauna by Nicolás Pereda (Spanish)
Suk Suk by Ray Yeung (Hong Kong) 
Long Time No See by Pierre Filmon (France)
Summer Rebels by Martina Sakova (Slovakia)
In The Dusk by Šarūnas Bartas (Lithuania)
A Common Crime by Francisco Márquez (Argentina)
Lola by Laurent Micheli (Belgium, France)
The Voiceless by Pascal Rabaté (France)
The Taste of Pho by Mariko Bobrik (Poland, Germany)
Stardust by Gabriel Range (UK)
Funny Face by Tim Sutton (USA)
Naked Animals by Melanie Waelde (Germany)
Las Niñas by Pilar Palomero (Spain)
Kala Azar by Janis Rafa (Netherlands, Greece)
История Одной Картины by Ruslan Magomadov (Russia)
Paradies by Immanuel Esser (Germany)
Borderline by Anna Alfieri (UK)
A Simple Man by Tassos Gerakinis (Greece)
180° Rule by Farnoosh Samadi (Iran)
Here We Are by Nir Bergman (Israel, Italy)
The Border by Davide David Carrera (Colombia)
End Of Season by ElmarImanov (Azerbaijan, Germany, Georgia)
This Is My Desire by Arie Esiri, Chuko Esiri (Nigeria, USA)
Karnawal by Juan Pablo Felix (Argentina)
Parents by Eric Bergkraut, Ruth Schweikert (Switzerland)
The Voice by OgnjenSviličić (Croatia)
Spiral...Fear Is Everywhere by Kurtis David Harder (Canada)
Isaac by Angeles Hernandez & David Matamoros (Spain)
Farewell Amor by Ekwa Msangi (US)
The Man Who Sold His Skin by Kaouther Ben Hania (Tunisia, France)
Roland Rabers Cabaret of Death by Roland Reber (Germany)
Children of the Sun by Prasanna Vithanage (Sri Lanka)

Country in focus
Four Bangladeshi films will be showcased in this section.

 Jibondhuli by Tanvir Mokammel
 Meghmallar by Zahidur Rahim Anjan
 Under Construction by Rubaiyat Hossain
 Sincerely Yours, Dhaka by Tanvir Ahsan, Abdullah Al Noor, Syed Saleh Sobhan Auneem, Krishnendu Chattopadhyay, Golam Kibria Farooki, Mir Mukarram Hossain, Nuhash Humayun, Mahmudul Islam, Rahat Rahman, Robiul Alam Robi, Syed Ahmed Shawki

Goan films
Source

Shinvar - The Downpour
Written in the Corners

ICFT UNESCO Gandhi Medal
The IFFI presents ICFT Prize consisting of the UNESCO Gandhi Medal in collaboration with International Council for Film, Television and  Audiovisual Communication (ICFT) Paris.

200 Meters by Ameen Nayfeh (Italy, Sweden, Jordan, Palestine, Qatar)
An Old Lady by Lim Sun-ae (South Korea)
Berlin Alexanderplatz by Burhan Qurbani (Germany, Netherlands)
The Lamp of Truth by Thanesh Gopal (Canada)
Palmyra by Ivan Bolotnikov (Russia) 
Prawaas by Shashank Udapurkar (India)
Red Soil by Farid Bentouumi (Belgium, France)
Summertime by Carlos López Estrada (USA)
Thahira by Siddik Paravoor (India) 
Unsound by Ian Watson (Australia)

Debut director
Gold For Dogs by Anna Cazenave Cambet (France)
Otto the Barbarian by Ruxandra Maria Ghițescu (Belgium, Romania)
Ravine by Balázs Krasznahorkai (Hungary)
Valentina by Cássio Pereira dos Santos (Brazil)
Wildfire by Cathy Brady (Ireland, UK)

Special screening
Acasă, My Home by Radu Ciorniciuc (Romania)
An Impossible Project by Jens Meurer (Germany)
I Am Greta by Nathan Grossman  (Sweden)
Little Girl by Sébastien Lifshitz (France)
Netaji Subhas Chandra Bose: The Forgotten Hero by Shyam Benegal (India)
The Human Voice by Pedro Almodóvar  (Spain)

References

External links
 

2020 film festivals
2020 festivals in Asia
51
2020 in Indian cinema